Mongpu or Möngpu (also known as Mong Pu or Möng Pu) was a small state of the Shan States in what is today Burma.

History
Mongpu was a small dependency of Kengtung State that had been a tract of land claimed by Mongnai State but annexed by Kengtung along with Monghsat further to the south. The capital and residence of the ruler was Mong Pu (Möng Pu) town. 

Little is known about this state except that its forests, which included valuable teak, had been overexploited at the turn of the 20th century during British Rule in Burma.

References

Shan States